Lidia Gueiler Tejada (28 August 1921 – 9 May 2011) was a Bolivian politician who served as the 56th president of Bolivia on an interim basis from 1979 to 1980. She was Bolivia's first female Head of State, and the second female republican Head of State in the history of the Americas (the first was Isabel Perón in Argentina between 1974 and 1976).

She was the cousin of American actress Raquel Welch.

Background and earlier career
Gueiler was born in Cochabamba, to Moisés Gueiler Grunewelt, an immigrant from Germany and a Bolivian mother, Raquel Tejada Albornoz. She received a BA degree from Instituto Americano in Cochabamba. In the 1940s, she joined the Movimiento Nacionalista Revolucionario (MNR). When that party came to power as a result of the 1952 National Revolution, Gueiler became a member of the Congress of Bolivia, serving in that capacity from 1956 until 1964.  In 1964, she went into exile abroad after the MNR was toppled from power by generals Barrientos and Ovando. She spent the next fifteen years out of the country, and joined Juan Lechín's Revolutionary Party of the Nationalist Left (PRIN).

She also became the vice-president of the Revolutionary Left Front.

Upon returning to Bolivia in 1979, Gueiler again ran for Congress and was elected President of the Chamber of Deputies of Bolivia (the lower house of the Bolivian Congress) as part of the MNR alliance of former president Víctor Paz Estenssoro.

As no presidential candidate in the 1979 elections had received the necessary 50% of the vote, it fell to Congress to decide who should be president. Surprisingly, no agreement could be reached, no matter how many votes were taken. An alternative was offered in the form of the President of the Senate of Bolivia, Dr. Wálter Guevara, who was named temporary Bolivian President in August 1979 pending the calling of new elections in 1980. Guevara was shortly afterwards overthrown in a military coup led by General Alberto Natusch. The population resisted, however, led by a nationwide labor strike called by the powerful Central Obrera Boliviana ("COB") of Juan Lechín. In the end, Natusch was able to occupy the Palacio Quemado for only sixteen days, after which he was forced to give up power. The only face-saving concession he extracted from Congress was the promise that Guevara not be allowed to resume his duties as president.

Interim President of Bolivia
The above condition was accepted and a new provisional president was found in Lidia Gueiler, then leader of the lower congressional house.

As interim President, Gueiler was entrusted with the task of conducting new elections, which were held on 29 June 1980.

Overthrown in bloody coup
Before the winners could take their parliamentary seats, however, Gueiler herself was overthrown in a bloody right-wing military coup by her cousin, General Luis García Meza Tejada. Gueiler then left the country, and lived in France until the fall of the dictatorship in 1982.

Later diplomatic and other activities
Later, she served her country mostly in the diplomatic sphere, having been appointed Bolivia's ambassador to first Colombia, then West Germany, and finally—after joining Jaime Paz's "Movimiento de Izquierda Revolucionaria"—to Venezuela (1989). She retired from public life in the mid-1990s.

Gueiler was involved in various Bolivian feminist organizations throughout her life. She opposed the United States-backed war on drugs in Latin America, particularly the so-called Plan Colombia. In addition, she authored two books, publishing La mujer y la revolución ("The woman and the revolution") in 1960 and her autobiography, Mi pasión de lideresa ("My passion as a leader"), in 2000. She supported the candidacy of Evo Morales in the 2005 election.

In June 2009, Gueiler accepted the role of honorary president of the Human Rights Foundation in Bolivia.

She is the recipient of several awards, including the Order of the Condor of the Andes Grand Cross and the 1979 United Nations Woman of the Year award.

Death
On 9 May 2011, Gueiler died in La Paz following a long illness. She was 89 years old.

See also
 Cabinet of Lidia Gueiler

References

External links
Newspaper clippings about Lidia Gueiler

1921 births
2011 deaths
20th-century Bolivian politicians
20th-century Bolivian women politicians
20th-century Bolivian women writers
21st-century Bolivian women writers
Ambassadors of Bolivia to Colombia
Ambassadors of Bolivia to Venezuela
Ambassadors of Bolivia to West Germany
Bolivian exiles
Bolivian feminists
Bolivian people of German descent
Bolivian women diplomats
Bolivian women writers
Female heads of state
Leaders ousted by a coup
Members of the Chamber of Deputies (Bolivia)
Members of the Senate of Bolivia
People from Cochabamba
Presidents of Bolivia
Presidents of the Chamber of Deputies (Bolivia)
Revolutionary Left Front (Bolivia) politicians
Revolutionary Nationalist Movement politicians
Bolivian woman ambassadors
Women legislative speakers